Francophonia may refer to:
 Francophonie, the term meaning use of the French language 
 Francofonia, a 2015 film

Disambiguation pages